Playlife was a fashion company based in Treviso, Italy. It was a wholly owned subsidiary of the Benetton Group.

History
In July 1997, Benetton Group acquired a 57% stake in Benetton Sportsystem from Edizione Holdings for 318bn lire. At this time, it was rebranded to Playlife to represent sports equipment, goods and fashion for the company with brands such as Prince, Rollerblade and Kästle. In mid 1998, Benetton predicted around 40 Playlife specific stores would open in Europe. By 1999, the entire former Benetton Sportsystem brand was consolidated into the group under Playlife.

Playlife produced the tracksuits and casual shoes used by the Italian Olympic Team at the 2000 Olympic Games in Sydney. The team also opened the first dedicated Playlife store in Milan.

Store expansion continued and by 2011, Giovanni Peracin was announced as the new Playlife Business Director. At the same time, Benetton opened a new Playlife concept store in the headquarters city of Treviso, Italy.

However by late 2013, Playlife was axed by the Benetton Group during a restructuring.

Formula One

Between 1998 and 2000, the Benetton Formula One team utilised Supertec engines that were rebranded to Playlife, and the cars featured sponsorship from the company.

Complete Formula One World Championship results
(key) (results in bold indicate pole position) (Races in italics indicate fastest lap)

References

Formula One
Benetton Group
Sporting goods manufacturers of Italy